"J'ai demandé à la lune" ("I asked the moon" in English) is the most popular song from the 2002 album Paradize which allowed Indochine to reconnect with the media that had abandoned the band a decade earlier. Indochine had gone through a vast amount of criticism before the release of the song. Written by Mickaël Furnon, the singer of Mickey 3D, the song was released as the second single from this album in March 2002, and quickly became a national success, selling over a million units. The album similarly achieved commercial success a few months later.

Background and music video
During the recording of the album, Indochine's singer Nicola Sirkis asked Pauline, the 8 yo daughter of his friend Rudy Léonet to perform the background vocals.

The music video shows Sirkis walking towards the camera with a baby, then a young child in his arms, and finally Pauline appears alongside him and sings a duet with Sirkis.

Chart performance
The song was listed on the French SNEP Singles Chart, and debuted at number 14 on 13 April 2002 and reached number one for one week on 20 July. The single remained in the top ten for 20 weeks, in the top 50 for 27 weeks and on the charts (top 100) for 31 weeks. It finally achieved Diamond status on 6 November 2002 and was the fifth best-selling single of the year. As of August 2014, the song was the 25th best-selling single of the 21st century in France, with 515,000 units sold.

In Belgium (Wallonia), the single charted for 36 weeks. It first stabilized in the low positions, then entered the top ten in its 12th week and stayed there for 17 consecutive weeks, peaking at number one for five weeks. After falling off the top five, it almost did not drop. The single was ranked fifth on the 2002 End of the Year Chart.

In Switzerland, "J'ai demandé à la lune" debuted at a peak of number four on 21 July 2002. It stayed for many weeks at the bottom of the chart (top 100) and became the 39th hit of the year in the country.

Cover versions
In 2004, the song was covered by Mickey 3D on the live album Live à Saint-Étienne.

There is also a longer version, which was available on a CD sold in December 2002 for the benefit of the association Médecins Sans Frontières.

The song is also covered by Vox Angeli, a choir composed of children, and features as the first track on the 2008 album of the same name.

The song is also covered by Scala & Kolacny Brothers

In 2011, the single was partly re-written by Mickaël Furnon under the title "On demande pas la lune" for the annual Les Enfoires charity concert. This version peaked at number 30 on the French Singles Chart, and at number nine on the Belgian (Wallonia) Ultratop 40.

In 2021, Québecois singer-songwriter Ghostly Kisses (real name Margaux Sauvé) released her version of the song in partnership with composer pianist Louis-Étienne Santais.

Track listings
 CD single
 "J'ai demandé à la lune" — 3:29
 "Punker" — 2:50
 "Glory Hole" — 3:27

Charts and sales

Weekly charts

Year-end charts

Certifications

References

External links
 "J'ai demandé à la lune", lyrics
 "J'ai demandé à la lune", music video

2002 singles
Indochine (band) songs
Ultratop 50 Singles (Wallonia) number-one singles
SNEP Top Singles number-one singles
French rock songs